This was the first edition of the women's event.

Irina Bara and Ekaterine Gorgodze won the title, defeating Carolina Alves and Marina Bassols Ribera in the final, 6–4, 6–3.

Seeds

Draw

Draw

References

External links

Main Draw

Montevideo Open - Doubles
Tennis tournaments in Uruguay
2021 in Uruguayan sport